Marquess Lie of Han (Chinese: 韩烈侯; pinyin: Hán Lìehóu), also known as Marquess Wu of Han (韩武侯) (died 387 BC), ancestral name Jì (姬), clan name Hán (韩), personal name Qǔ (取), was the ruler of the State of Han between 399 BC and until his death in 387 BC. He was the son of Marquess Jing of Han. In the first years of Marquess Lie's rule, his uncle Han Xialei (韩侠累) was the state's chancellor. A power struggle between Han Xialei and another minister, Yan Sui (严遂), developed into a deep resentment between the two. In 397 BC Yan Sui paid a huge sum to assassin Nie Zheng (聂政) and assassinated Han Xialei. In 394 BC, Han defended Lu from a Qi invasion. In 391 BC the State of Qin invaded Yiyang and took six pieces of land. Marquess Lie died in 387 BC and was succeeded by his son Marquess Wen of Han.

Ancestors

References

Sources
Shiji Chapter 45
Zizhi Tongjian Volume 1

387 BC deaths
Zhou dynasty nobility
Monarchs of Han (state)
Year of birth unknown